Radim Gaudentius (c. 970 – c. 1020) was Archbishop of Gniezno and the first Polish archbishop.

Background
Radim was an illegitimate son of White Croatian Prince Slavník, and thus the half-brother of Adalbert of Prague.
In 989, the two journeyed to Rome where they joined the Benedictine monastery of Sts. Boniface and Alexius on the Aventine, with Radim adopting the name Gaudencius or Gaudentius. He accompanied Adalbert on his fatal journey to Prussia in 997.

Surviving the mission fatal to his half-brother, back in Rome he related the events of the journey to Abbot John Canaparius, who wrote a biography of Adalbert, and worked to promote his canonization.

Historians are not certain with regards to his date of death, suggesting a range of 1006 to 1022. His date of birth is also an estimate, in the range of late 960s to early 970s.

In Czech Republic he is commemorated as Saint Radim in the national liturgical calendar with an optional memorial on Oct. 12. Commemorated on January 5 in Orthodox Church. See Wikipedia Eastern Orthodox Liturgics.

Further reading

 Attwater, D.: Slovník svatých, Vimperk 1993
 Attwater, Donald and Catherine Rachel John. The Penguin Dictionary of Saints. 3rd edition. New York: Penguin Books, 1993. .
 Bruno z Querfurtu: Život svatého Vojtěcha, Praha 1996
 Kolektiv: Bohemia Sancta: životopisy českých světců a přátel Božích, Praha 1990
 Kolektiv: Svatý Vojtěch, sborník k mileniu, Praha 1997
 Michal Lutovský, Zdeněk Petráň: Slavníkovci

References

External links

Virtual tour Gniezno Cathedral 

960s births
Medieval Bohemian nobility
11th-century Roman Catholic archbishops in Poland
Archbishops of Gniezno
11th-century deaths
Slavník dynasty
11th-century Bohemian people